= Rna, ro-associated y4 pseudogene 2 =

Pseudogene in the species Homo sapiens

RNY4P2

Identifiers
- Aliases: RNY4P2, hY4.B7, RNA, Ro-associated Y4 pseudogene 2, RNY4 pseudogene 2
- External IDs: GeneCards: RNY4P2; OMA:RNY4P2 - orthologs
Orthologs
Species	Human	Mouse
Entrez	6088	n/a
Ensembl	n/a	n/a
UniProt	n a	n/a
RefSeq (mRNA)	n/a	n/a
RefSeq (protein)	n/a	n/a
Location (UCSC)	n/a	n/a
PubMed search		n/a
- Wikidata
View/Edit Human

RNA, Ro-associated Y4 pseudogene 2 is a protein that in humans is encoded by the RNY4P2 gene.
